Tiefstack is a station on the Berlin-Hamburg railway line and served by the trains of Hamburg S-Bahn lines S2 and S21. The station was originally opened in 1842 and is located in the Hamburg district of Rothenburgsort, Germany. Rothenburgsort is part of the borough of Hamburg-Mitte.

History  
The station was originally opened by the Hamburg-Bergedorf Railway Company in 1842 to serve the commuter rail in Hamburg's south-eastern quarters. In 1958 Tiefstack station was electrified and integrated into the Hamburg S-Bahn network.

Service 
The lines S2 and S21 of Hamburg S-Bahn call at Tiefstack station.

See also  

 Hamburger Verkehrsverbund (HVV)
 List of Hamburg S-Bahn stations

References

External links 

 Line and route network plans at hvv.de 

Hamburg S-Bahn stations in Hamburg
Buildings and structures in Hamburg-Mitte
Railway stations in Germany opened in 1842